Starling Arrow is an American  a cappella spirit-folk ensemble formed in 2020 by Leah Song and Chloe Smith (of Rising Appalachia), Tina Malia, Ayla Nereo, and Marya Stark.

History

The ensemble was conceived and formed during the pandemic lockdown of 2020, meeting via Zoom. The group explains the original of its name as follows:

The group gave their debut performance at the Hawk and Hawthorne in Barnardsville, North Carolina in July 2022.

The ensemble released its first single, "Wild Sweet", written by Ayla Nereo, in October 2022. The song received a positive review from Ear to the Ground. A second single, "Into the River", written by Chloe Smith, was released in November 2022. Randy Radic, writing for Guitar Girl, described the song as "brilliant".

The ensemble released its third single, "By the Jordan", written by Tina Malia, in December 2022.
A fourth single, "Fly Away", written by Marya Stark, was released in January 2023, as was a fifth single, "Oh Darlin'", written by Leah Song.

The group released their first album, Cradle, on February 16, 2023, produced and engineered by Tina Malia. Saving Country Music listed it as one of their most anticipated albums of 2023.

Discography

Albums
 Cradle (February 16, 2023)

Singles
 "Wild Sweet" (October 7, 2022)
 "Into the River" (November 4, 2022)
 "By the Jordan" (December 2, 2022) 
 "Fly Away" (January 6, 2023)
 "Oh Darlin'" (January 27, 2023)

Videos

See also

References

Citations

Works cited

External links

American girl groups
American indie folk groups
American vocal groups
Female-fronted musical groups
Musical groups established in 2020